Paddhari railway station is a  railway station on the Western Railway network in the state of Gujarat, India. Paddhari railway station is 25 km far away from Rajkot railway station. Passenger, Express and Superfast trains halt here.

Nearby stations 

Chanol is nearest railway station towards , whereas Khanderi is nearest railway station towards  .

Major trains

Following Express and Superfast trains halt at Paddhari railway station in both direction:

 19217/18 Bandra Terminus - Jamnagar Saurashtra Janata Express
 22959/60 Surat - Jamnagar Intercity Superfast Express
 22961/62 Surat - Hapa Intercity Weekly Superfast Express
 22945/46 Mumbai Central - Okha Saurashtra Mail

References

See also
 Rajkot district

Rajkot district
Rajkot railway division